Emmanuel Lutheran Church in Dakota City, Nebraska, United States, is a Greek Revival church designed and built by Augustus T. Haase in 1860.  It is believed to be the first Lutheran church built in Nebraska and is certainly the oldest Lutheran Church structure still standing in Nebraska.

It was listed on the National Register of Historic Places in 1969.

References

External links

Dakota City site

19th-century Lutheran churches in the United States
Buildings and structures in Dakota County, Nebraska
Churches completed in 1860
Churches on the National Register of Historic Places in Nebraska
Historic American Buildings Survey in Nebraska
National Register of Historic Places in Dakota County, Nebraska